The Infiniti Q70 and Q70L is a line of mid-size luxury (executive) cars from Nissan luxury division Infiniti. Essentially an update to the Infiniti M series with minor cosmetic changes, the Q70 name was introduced to reflect Infiniti's updated "Q" nomenclature.

First generation

The Chinese model went on sale in 2012.

In 2013, the entire Infiniti line was renamed, with the M sedans becoming the Q70; this reflected the model's relative position in the Infiniti lineup, rather than the engine displacement as had previously been used.

US models went on sale in 2014 model year vehicles. Early models included 3.7, 3.7 AWD, 5.6, 5.6 AWD, Hybrid.

Engines

Transmissions
All models included 7-speed electronically controlled automatic transmission with Adaptive Shift Control (ASC) and manual shift mode.

Special editions

Q70, Q70 Hybrid (2014-)
Changes to Q70 include new front and rear fascias, new grille design, Infiniti signature LED headlights, LED taillights, LED fog lights and side rearview mirrors with integrated LED turn signals, 3 new body colours (Hermosa Blue, Chestnut Bronze and Graphite Shadow) with Moonlight White colour including Pearl option, revised interior content and trim, with leatherette replacing leather-appointed seating on base Q70 grades, revised 18-inch aluminum-alloy wheel designs, addition of optional Backup Collision Intervention, standard Active Noise Control noise cancellation, choice of 4 interior colours (Graphite, Stone, Wheat and Java).

Additional changes to Q70 Hybrid include revised 18-inch aluminum-alloy wheel designs, optional Around View Monitor with Moving Object Detection (MOD) and Forward Emergency Braking (FEB).

The vehicle was unveiled in the 2014 New York International Auto Show, followed by the 2014 Paris Motor Show.

US models went on sale 2015 model year vehicles. Early models included 3.7 (335PS), 3.7 AWD (335PS), 5.6 (426PS), 5.6 AWD (426PS), Hybrid.

Deliveries of European models began in December 2014. Early European models included 2.2d, Hybrid.

UK models went on sale in 2015. Early models included 2.2d, 3.7 (320PS), Hybrid (364PS).

Q70L, (Y51, 2015-) & Q70L Bespoke Edition Concept
The design was based on Nissan Cima.

Changes included redesigned 'sword brow' daytime running lights, 5 extra LED light sources, addition of tail chrome trim, new split rear bumper, semi-aniline leather interior upholstery, silver powder wood veneers, redesigned noise isolation and shock absorption, electromagnet rear doors and trunk, independent rear entertainment system, rear seats with customizable inclines, redesigned centre handle, forward collision warning, backup collision intervention, around view monitor.

Q70L Bespoke Edition (Q70L联袂特别定制版) is a version of Q70L with design from Q80 Inspiration, interior from Q60 Concept, with 4 seats with baste seam leather upholstery.

The vehicles were unveiled in Auto Shanghai 2015.

China models went on sale in Q2 2015.

US models went on sale 2015 model year vehicles. Early models included 3.7 (335PS), 3.7 AWD (335PS), 5.6 (422PS), 5.6 AWD (422PS).

2016 Q70 Premium Select Edition (2015-)
The vehicle was unveiled in the 2015 Pebble Beach Concours d'Elegance.

US models went on sale in November 2015 at Infiniti retailers.

Recalls
The 2014 Q70 hybrid vehicles manufactured November 7, 2013, to December 10, 2013 were recalled due to damaged housings could crack and fracture, creating road debris and disabling the vehicle and increasing the risk of a crash. In addition, 2014 Q70 hybrid vehicles manufactured November 7, 2013, to May 7, 2014 were recalled due to a software error, the electric motor may stop working while the vehicle is being driven using the electric motor only, leading to increase the risk of a crash.

The 2014–15 Infiniti Q70 was recalled due to fuel pressure sensors not being sufficiently tightened during production, leading to possible fuel leak.

Discontinuation
In 2019, Nissan confirmed that the Infiniti Q70, Q70L, Q30, and QX30 models will be discontinued after the 2019 model year due to poor sales as people in Canada, Mexico, and the United States prefer to purchase crossovers and SUVs instead of sedans, hatchbacks, estates, convertibles, and coupes. Another reason for the discontinuation is also caused by Nissan's plans to withdraw the Infiniti brand from the Australian, New Zealand, South Korean, Hong Kong, Macau, Vietnamese, Indonesian, Malaysian, Singaporean, and West European markets by the end of 2020, with Nissan already withdrawing the Infiniti brand from the South African market in 2017 due to losses and poor sales. Nissan has no plans of abandoning sedans entirely and plans on possibly introducing an Infiniti EV vehicle in 2021 for the 2022 model year based from QS Inspiration concept.

The Q70L continues to be offered in the Chinese market as of 2022.

Sales by calendar year

References

External links

Q70: USA
Q70L: USA, China
Press kit:
Q70: 2014 USA, 2015 USA, 2016 USA
Q70 Hybrid: 2015 USA, 2016 USA
Q70L: 2015 USA, 2016 USA

All-wheel-drive vehicles
Cars introduced in 2013
Cars of Japan
Convertibles
Coupés
Executive cars
Flagship vehicles
Hybrid electric vehicles
Luxury vehicles
Mid-size cars
Rear-wheel-drive vehicles
Sports sedans
Vehicles with four-wheel steering
Q70